Paulo Costa (born 1991) is a Brazilian mixed martial artist.

Paulo Costa or Paulo da Costa may also refer to:

Paulo Costa (footballer) (born 1979), Portuguese footballer
Tinga (footballer, born 1981) (Paulo Edson Nascimento Costa), Brazilian footballer
Paulo Costa Lima (born 1954), Brazilian composer
Paulo da Costa (writer), Canadian-Portuguese writer

See also
 Paolo Costa (disambiguation)